William McNair may refer to:
 William N. McNair, mayor of Pittsburgh, Pennsylvania 
 William S. McNair, U.S. Army general
 William W. McNair, mayor of St. Anthony, Minnesota
 William Watts McNair, British surveyor